Deivanayaki better known by her stage name K. R. Vijaya  is an Indian actress who has featured in Tamil, Malayalam, Telugu and Kannada films.  She started her career in 1963 and has been acting for more than five decades in South Indian cinema. The actress has worked with almost all the stalwarts of South Indian cinema and has played many key roles.

Early life
Vijaya was born as Deivanayaki, eldest children to Ramachandra Nair and Kalyani at Chennai, Tamil Nadu, India. Her father was in the army and her mother was a housewife. She has a younger brother, Narayanan and four younger sisters, K. R. Vatsala, K. R. Savithri, Sashikala and Radha. She had her primary education at Government Higher Secondary School, Adyar, Chennai. Her father wanted her to become an actress since he was himself acting in M. R. Radha's drama troupe at the time after retiring from army. She made her film debut with Karpagam in 1963. She was the first ever actress to own a private jet.

Personal life
She married a businessman, Sudarshan Velayuthan Nair in 1966. Her husband was the CEO of Sudarshan trading company and a movie producer. The couple have a daughter Hemalatha (born 1967). Velayuthan Nair died on 26 March 2016, aged 82.

Career
Vijaya's first break itself was as a heroine in her debut film Karpagam (1963). Her notable films include Idhaya Kamalam (1965), Odayil Ninnu(1965), Saraswathi Sabatham (1966), Selvam (1966), Nenjirukkum Varai (1967), Iru Malargal (1967), Namma Veettu Deivam (1970), Dheerga Sumangali (1974), Thangappathakkam (1974), Thirisoolam (1979) and Ithiri Poove Chuvannapoove (1984).

She was called as "Punnagai Arasi" (Queen of the smiles - in Tamil) by her fans at a function held in Trichy. Vijaya was always the first choice of directors to portray the roles of Hindu goddesses due to her looks which was similar to conventional depictions. Apart from her essaying the role of Goddess Shakti in Mel Maruvathoor Arpudhangal (1986), she essayed the Mariamman avatar in the film Mahasakthi Mariamman (1986) and Kandhan Karunai (1967). K R Vijaya reminisces about her first director "who gave her life" K. S. Gopalakrishnan who also directed her in her 100th film  Nathayil Muthu (1973). Apart from acting in many films, she has also acted in Raja Rajeswari and Kudumbam, two teleserials, that were telecast on television in both India and Sri Lanka. 

Vijaya returned to a mythological role in Sri Rama Rajyam (2011). K.R Vijaya also played Kausalya for the first time in Bapu's mythological extravaganza. She has acted in over 500 films.

Awards
 Satyabama College
 2009 - Doctorate

Nandi Awards
 1989 - Nandi Special Jury Award for Sutradharulu

Tamil Nadu State Film Awards
 1967 - Best Actress for Iru Malargal
 1970 - Best Actress for Namma Veetu Dheivam

Filmfare Awards South
 1974 - Filmfare Special Award - South for Dheerga Sumangali
 2004 - Lifetime Achievement Award

Kerala State Film Awards
 1984 - Second Best Actress - Ithiri Poove Chuvannapoove
Kerala Film Critics Association Awards
 2013: Chalachitra Rathnam Award
Janmabhoomi Television Awards
2018: Best Character Actress - Sathyam Sivam Sundaram
Other Awards
2013: Nagi Reddy Memorial Awards
2017: Congress Managalir Awards
2019: Nakshathira Sathanaiyalar 2019

Filmography

Television serials

References

External links

Living people
Indian film actresses
Actresses from Thrissur
Actresses in Tamil cinema
Kerala State Film Award winners
Actresses in Malayalam cinema
Tamil Nadu State Film Awards winners
Filmfare Awards South winners
Telugu actresses
Actresses in Malayalam television
Indian television actresses
20th-century Indian actresses
21st-century Indian actresses
Actresses in Tamil television
Actresses in Telugu cinema
Actresses in Hindi cinema
Actresses in Kannada cinema
Year of birth missing (living people)